Miltos Yerolemou is a British actor best known for his role as Syrio Forel in the HBO fantasy TV series Game of Thrones.

Yerolemou has also made appearances in films such as Star Wars: The Force Awakens and The Danish Girl.

Early life and career
The son of Greek Cypriot parents, Yerolemou was born in London and grew up in the United Kingdom. After his graduation, Yerolemou did not take lessons, but instead learned how to act by stage experience.

From 1997 to 2003 he was a regular on the television series Hububb. In 1998, he had a supporting role in Middleton's Changeling, and in 1999, he took part in a film adaptation of the Shakespeare play The Winter's Tale. It was followed by two extras roles in the documentary Neanderthal. He also appeared in the British series My Family, The West Wittering Affair, and the short film The Public Benefits.

Later career

Yerolemou's first major role was as Syrio Forel in the first season of the HBO fantasy series Game of Thrones. In the series, Yerolemou primarily worked with actress Maisie Williams as Arya Stark, and portrayed Syrio Forel, a character also known as "The First Sword of Braavos." Thus most of his scenes involved sword work. Following his appearance in Game of Thrones, Yerolemou was cast in Star Wars: The Force Awakens, as well as the award-winning film The Danish Girl.

Yerolemou has appeared on stage with the Royal Shakespeare Company, and had a role in a BBC adaptation of Hilary Mantel's Wolf Hall.

Yerolemou has also appeared in the BBC One series New Blood and the British-American film Tulip Fever.

Most recently Yerolemou played The Fool in the Talawa Theatre Company and Royal Exchange Manchester co-production of King Lear, with Don Warrington taking on the title role. His performance was very well received, with reviews stating that his "extraordinary despair ... matches [his] brilliant comic timing", that he "manages to provide a key to the entire performance", and "irrepressible".

Filmography

References

External links

Living people
English male television actors
English male film actors
Male actors from London
English people of Greek Cypriot descent
Year of birth missing (living people)